Preparatory Institute for Engineering Nabeul  (المعهد التحضيري للدراسات الهندسية بنابل) or IPEIN  is a Tunisian university establishment founded in 1986 according to the law N°86-954. Part of the University of Carthage. It is the first preparatory  engineering institute in Tunisia.It is located in Mrezka, Nabeul.

Mission 
The main mission of the institute is to provide a two-year curriculum of intense mathematics, physics and industrial science courses to prepare students for the national engineering selective exams, or commonly known in French as concours nationaux d'entrée aux cycles de formation d'ingénieurs. Success in the exams is determined by a score-based ranking system limited by a national quota. Successful candidates can apply to technical and scientific schools, such as the Polytechnic School of Tunisia and the Graduate School of Communications of Tunis. Each school has its own quotas for each one of its programs. Notable schools will generally require a very good rank (300 and below).

See also

Preparatory Institute 
 Monastir Preparatory Engineering Institute
 Tunis Preparatory Engineering Institute
 El Manar Preparatory Engineering Institute
 Sfax Preparatory Engineering Institute

References

External links 
 Official website

1986 establishments in Tunisia
Educational institutions established in 1986
Universities in Tunisia
Education in Tunisia
Educational organisations based in Tunisia
Scientific organisations based in Tunisia